Rhonda Hannett is a retired Australian women's basketball player.

Biography
Hannett played for the Australia women's national basketball team at the 1971 FIBA World Championship, hosted by Brazil. At that tournament, Hannett led the scoring for Australia with an average of 8.6 points per game.

References

Living people
Australian women's basketball players
Year of birth missing (living people)